Edward St. Loe or Seyntlowe (died 1578), of Sutton Court, Somerset and Knighton, near Ramsbury, Wiltshire, was an English politician.

He was a Member (MP) of the Parliament of England for Bath in 1559 and for Downton in 1572.

References

Year of birth missing
1578 deaths
People from Somerset
People from Wiltshire
English MPs 1559
English MPs 1572–1583